Under the Rainbow is a 2013 French comedy film directed by Agnès Jaoui. It was co-written by Jaoui and Jean-Pierre Bacri.

Cast

 Agathe Bonitzer as Laura
 Agnès Jaoui as Marianne
 Arthur Dupont as Sandro
 Jean-Pierre Bacri as Pierre
 Benjamin Biolay as Maxime Wolf
 Dominique Valadié as Jacqueline
 Valérie Crouzet as Éléonore
 Beatrice Rosen as Fanfan
 Didier Sandre as Guillaume Casseul
 Laurent Poitrenaux as Éric
 Nina Meurisse as Clémence

Reception
Jordan Mintzer of The Hollywood Reporter called it "A modern-day fairy tale wrapped in a cloak of sly one-liners and deadpan existentialism"

References

External links
 
 
 
  (with English subtitles)
  (without English subtitles)

2013 films
2013 comedy films
French comedy films
2010s French-language films
Films set in Paris
Films shot in France
Films based on fairy tales
2010s French films